The Western Development Region (Nepali: पश्चिमाञ्चल विकास क्षेत्र, Pashchimānchal Bikās Kshetra) was one of Nepal's five development regions. It was located in the west-central part of the country, with its headquarters located in Pokhara. This Development Region was divided into three parts, from south to north in order of increasing altitude: Terai, Hilly and Himalayan. Mustang, Damodar, Peri, Thaple, Ganesh are among the major ranges of the Himalayas.

It comprised three zones:
 Dhawalagiri (or Dhaualagiri)
 Gandaki
 Lumbini

References

Development Region
Development Region
Dhaulagiri Zone
Gandaki Zone
Lumbini Zone

Former subdivisions of Nepal
2015 disestablishments in Nepal